Ang Pangarap Kong Holdap is a 2018 Philippine comedy heist film directed by Marius Talampas.

The film follows a group of inept robbers of Eman (Pepe Herrera), Toto (Jerald Napoles), and Carlo (Jelson Bay) as well as newcomer Nicoy (Paolo Contis). Eman aspires his group to be the number one gang in Barangay Husay to follow the legacy of his father who is known for being the most notorious in their locale.

Cast
Pepe Herrera as Eman
Jerald Napoles as Toto
Jelson Bay as Carlo
Paolo Contis as Nicoy
Pen Medina as Ka Paeng

Release
Ang Pangarap Kong Holdap premiered in the Philippines on November 28, 2018. The film had dismal reception during its theatrical release. It was given a R-16 rating by the Movie and Television Review and Classification Board and there was difficulty in securing slots in local cinemas limiting the film's reach. According to Paolo Contis, one of the film's lead actors, cinema owners were hesitant of screening Ang Pangrap Kong Holdap due to a perception that the film title has a "bad connotation". According to director Marius Talampas, the film was only shown on mainstream cinemas for less than a week and was only screened in microcinemas thereafter where the film gradually garnered a cult following.

The film was released in Netflix on July 2, 2020 where it had more success. Ang Pangarap Kong Holdap became the number one most viewed film in the Philippines within 24 hours of its premiere in the digital platform and is still within the top ten most viewed film three days later.

References

2018 films
2018 comedy films
Philippine heist films
Philippine comedy films
2010s heist films
Philippine gangster films